The peppered flounder (Paralichthodes algoensis) is a flatfish of the family Paralichthodidae and the only species of the genus Paralichthodes. Its native habitat is the southeastern Atlantic and the western Indian Ocean, specifically the African coastline from Mossel Bay, South Africa, to Delagoa Bay, Mozambique.

Description
The peppered flounder is a right-eyed flounder with an elongated, oval body. Its upper surface is brownish grey with small dark spots and its underside is white. The lateral line is equally developed on both sides. It has a relatively large, symmetrical mouth.

References

peppered flounder
Fish of Mozambique
Marine fish of South Africa
peppered flounder
Taxa named by John Dow Fisher Gilchrist